Paul Raymond Jones (June 1, 1928 – January 26, 2010) was an American collector of African American art.

Jones, one of five children of Will and Ella Jones, grew up in Muscoda, a Tennessee Coal, Iron and Railroad Company mining camp near Bessemer, Alabama. After his mother formed a favorable impression of Northern schools while visiting the 1939 New York World's Fair, he was sent off to continue his education there. He returned to Alabama during high school and attended Alabama State University on scholarship. He was elected president of his freshman class and played on the Bulldogs football team. After two years he decided to pursue the study of law. He transferred to Howard University in Washington D. C. to complete his undergraduate studies. His application to the University of Alabama Law School in 1949 was officially discouraged on the basis of race. He completed a year of graduate work at Howard before returning to Bessemer.

In the 1960s, Jones was part of the "Birmingham Interracial Committee" of the "Jefferson County Coordinating Council for Social Forces" and later worked for the United States Department of Justice on Civil Rights issues and later the Department of Housing and Urban Development, where he was recognized for his work on the Model Cities Program. He also served as deputy director of the Peace Corps in Thailand.

In the early 1960s, Jones was inspired by the annual African-American art shows organized by Hale Woodruff at Atlanta University. He began collecting works by African-American artists, often befriending the younger artists from whom he purchased works. He hosted receptions at his home to encourage colleagues to purchase art and put pressure on galleries and museums to recognize African-American artwork.

Jones eventually amassed an important collection with over 2,000 pieces. A selection of his collection made its public debut in a 1993 exhibition at the University of Delaware. In 2001 Jones donated hundreds of the more valuable works to that University with several stipulations for how the school should leverage it to provide more opportunities for black students and art professionals. In 2008 he donated most of his remaining collection, 1,700 works, to the University of Alabama. 

Jones, who lived in Atlanta, died in January 2010. He was survived by a son.

References

 Smiles, Robin V. (March 29, 2001) "The Politics of Art - Paul R. Jones donates collection of Black art to University of Delaware." Black Issues in Higher Education
 Freightman, Connie Green (July 2002) "Paul R. Jones: Collector, activist and huge fan of Black art." New Crisis
 Amaki, Amalia (2004) A Century of African American Art: The Paul R. Jones Collection. Rutgers University Press 
  
 Anderson, Margaret L. and Neil F. Thomas (2009) Living Art: The Life of Paul R. Jones, African American Art Collector. University of Delaware Press 
 Huebner, Michael (January 28, 2010) "Paul R. Jones, art collector and Bessemer native, dies at 81." Birmingham News

External links
 Paul R. Jones Museum at ua.edu
 Paul R. Jones Collection at udel.edu
Stuart A. Rose Manuscript, Archives, and Rare Book Library, Emory University: Paul R. Jones papers

1928 births
2010 deaths
People from Bessemer, Alabama
Howard University alumni
Activists for African-American civil rights
American art collectors
Activists from Alabama